Clarence Leonard "Tuffy" Thompson (September 28, 1914 – February 5, 2000) was a halfback who played in the National Football League. He played two seasons with the Pittsburgh Pirates before becoming a member of the Green Bay Packers during his final season. He was number 27 on the cardinals and number 50 on the Packers.

References

External links

1914 births
2000 deaths
People from Montevideo, Minnesota
Pittsburgh Pirates (football) players
Green Bay Packers players
American football halfbacks
Minnesota Golden Gophers football players
Players of American football from Minnesota